Giani Gian Singh was a Sikh scholar and martial artist, belong to Nihang order, famous for his work on Shastarvidya. He spent 40 years on textual analysis of Guru Granth Sahib from very rare Manuscripts and over a hundred codices (Birs) and published some basic findings.
His work with Kundan Singh and Randhir Singh research scholar is known as Sri Guru Granth Sahib ji dian Santha-Sainchian are Puratan Hathlikhit Pavan Biran de Praspar Path-Bhedan di Suchi ( The list of textual variations present in the early sacred manuscripts and printed versions of the Guru Granth Sahib)  which was published in 1977.

References

Indian Sikhs
Nihang